Heggie's Rock is a large granite outcropping in Columbia County, Georgia, United States. Declared a National Natural Landmark in 1980, the property was purchased by The Nature Conservancy in 1983.

Description 
In 1980, the area was deemed a National Natural Landmark. In 1983, The Nature Conservancy purchased  of the rock, creating Heggie's Rock Preserve. In 1998, scientists at Heggie's Rock described a new genus and species of copepod found only at the rock.

Heggie's Rock is one of several large granite outcroppings in Georgia, along with Panola Mountain, Stone Mountain, and Arabia Mountain.

See also 
 List of National Natural Landmarks in Georgia

References

Further reading

External links 
 
 
 

Mountains of Georgia (U.S. state)
National Natural Landmarks in Georgia (U.S. state)
Protected areas of Columbia County, Georgia
Nature centers in Georgia (U.S. state)